In mathematics,  the continuous q-Hermite polynomials  are a family of basic hypergeometric orthogonal polynomials in the basic Askey scheme.  give a detailed list of their properties.

Definition

The  polynomials are given in terms of basic hypergeometric functions by

Recurrence and difference relations

 

with the initial conditions

 

From the above, one can easily calculate:

Generating function

 
where .

References

Orthogonal polynomials
Q-analogs
Special hypergeometric functions